Svend Carlsen (born 28 April 1938) is a Danish cross-country skier. He competed at the 1964 Winter Olympics and the 1968 Winter Olympics.

References

1938 births
Living people
Danish male cross-country skiers
Olympic cross-country skiers of Denmark
Cross-country skiers at the 1964 Winter Olympics
Cross-country skiers at the 1968 Winter Olympics
Sportspeople from Frederiksberg
20th-century Danish people